Trust You is the thirteenth Japanese-language single by American pop singer Yuna Ito. The title song, "Trust You" is the theme to Japanese anime Mobile Suit Gundam 00 season 2, while "Brand New World" was used as a tie-up song for the Commercial of Hawkins Sport.

In its first week, the single sold 27,254 copies, making it the third highest selling first week single sales by Ito as of March 2009, behind Endless Story and Precious. "Trust You" is Ito's first Top 5 single since the release of her previous single Mahaloha in June 2007. "Trust You" also gave Ito her highest first-week sales since 2006's Precious.

Track list

TV Promotional Performances
 04/25 - Hong Kong Best Advertisement Award 2009 (with Endless Story)

Chart

Oricon

Billboard

References

2009 singles
2009 songs
Yuna Ito songs